The Robert Honorary Award (Honorary Robert) has been given occasionally since 1986 as one of the Robert Awards by the Danish Film Academy. It is the Danish equivalent of the American Academy Honorary Award.

A Robert Honorary Award may be given to a film professional whose many years in the film industry deserve recognition and praise. It is also with this award, the Film Academy may choose to honour those film professionals that can not be nominated for a Robert within the existing categories – casting director, line producing, poster designers, and so on. The price is always given with a motivation and traditionally awarded at the Robert-ceremony.

In 2014, the Film Academy introduced one Honorary Robert Award, which the Board may choose to give to international film artists and film professionals, whose work has inspired and motivated Danish film-makers.

Recipients 
 1986: Erik Rasmussen
 1990: Ebbe Rode
 1991: Jannik Hastrup
 1994: Astrid Henning-Jensen
 1995: Per Holst
 1998: Henning Bahs and Erik Balling
 1999: Henning Moritzen
 2000: Marguerite Viby
 2001: Rolf Konow
 2002: Tove Jystrup
 2003: Kenneth Madsen
 2004: Helle Virkner
 2005: Bent Fabricius-Bjerre
 2006: Kirsten Dalgaard
 2009: 
 2010: Jette Termann
 2011: Jan Lehmann
 2012: Henning Carlsen
 2013: Ghita Nørby
 2014: Karen Bentzon
 2014: William Friedkin (Lifetime Achievement Award, Honorary Robert)
 2015: Christel Hammer
 2017: Jimmy Leavens
 2018:

See also 
 Bodil Honorary Award

References

External links 
  
 Listing of the major Robert Award recipients at Scope Film Guide

1986 establishments in Denmark
Awards established in 1986
Honorary